David Standish Ball (June 11, 1926 – April 18, 2017) was the seventh bishop of the Episcopal Diocese of Albany in the United States from 1984 to 1998.

Childhood, education and calling
David Standish Ball was born June 11, 1926, in Albany, New York, the son of Percival and Hazelton Ball. He attended The Milne School in Albany, where he was class president and a popular athlete. Ball served in the United States Navy during World War II. He graduated from Colgate University in 1950.

He answered the call to holy orders in the Episcopal Church. He attended the General Theological Seminary in New York City from 1950 to 1953.

He was ordained a deacon on June 14, 1953, and a priest on December 21, 1953, in Albany. He served as a curate at Bethesda Church in Saratoga Springs, in upstate New York, for three years.

He was elected canon in 1956, serving until 1961. He served three years as Canon Sacrist and two years as Canon Precentor.

He was then elected dean of the Cathedral of All Saints in Albany in 1960, and served over two decades, until 1984. During that time, he served on a number of non-profit boards, including as President of the Dudley Park Housing Authority, which developed a housing project in Arbor Hill, Albany, New York.

Bishop of Albany
On October 10, 1983, Ball was elected Bishop coadjutor of Albany at the age of 57. In February 1984, he was consecrated in apostolic succession by Presiding Bishop John Maury Allin, bishop David E. Richards, formerly suffragan of Albany and then bishop of the Anglican diocese of Central America, and the incumbent sixth bishop Wilbur Emory Hogg. Upon Bishop Hogg's retirement, in October 1984, Ball was installed in the cathedra in the choir at the Cathedral of All Saints, as the 7th Bishop of Albany.

Ball served from 1984 to 1998 as the seventh Diocesan bishop of Albany.

Ball opposed women's ordination in the 1970s and was briefly associated with the Episcopal Synod of America but later changed his position, serving with and ordaining female priests and deacons since at least 1989.

He took part in several consecrations of other bishops, including that of his successors. He was considered a conservative on issues such as apostolic succession.

He retired in 1998, at the then mandatory retirement age of 72.

In retirement
Upon his retirement, Ball was succeeded by then-bishop Daniel W. Herzog. Ball again became active in many local charities. The Bishop Ball Golf Tournament, an annual fundraiser for the cathedral, is named in his honor. The Doane Stuart School, on whose board he sat until mid-2008, named a trustee award for him.

Ball continued to serve as Bishop-in Residence at the Cathedral of All Saints. He gained a reputation on such issues as ecumenism and alternate oversight in the Anglican Communion.

Ball died in Loudonville, New York on April 18, 2017.

See also

 List of Episcopal bishops (U.S.)

References

External links
 Cathedral of All Saints website
 Episcopal Diocese of Albany official website

1926 births
2017 deaths
Anglo-Catholic bishops
Colgate University alumni
Religious leaders from Albany, New York
American Anglo-Catholics
20th-century American Episcopalians
Episcopal bishops of Albany